Astathes distincta is a species of beetle in the family Cerambycidae. It was described by Hintz in 1919. It is known from Cameroon and the Central African Republic.

References

D
Beetles described in 1919